Savvas Karipidis  (Greek: Σάββας Καρυπίδης; born 23 May 1979) is a  retired Greek male handball player. He was a member of the Greece men's national handball team, playing as a right wing. He was a part of the  team at the 2004 Summer Olympics and at the 2005 World Men's Handball Championship.

References

1979 births
Living people
Greek male handball players
Handball players at the 2004 Summer Olympics
Olympic handball players of Greece
Sportspeople from Katerini